Llanrhaeadr-ym-Mochnant is a village, community and an ecclesiastical parish in the extreme north of Powys, Wales; about 9 miles west of Oswestry and 12 miles south of Llangollen, on the B4580. It lies near the foothills of the Berwyn mountains on the river Rhaeadr. At the top end of the valley is the Pistyll Rhaeadr waterfall, one of the Seven Wonders of Wales in the old rhyme. One mile north of the town is the hill Moel Hen-fache (515 m). The community includes the hamlet of Llanarmon Mynydd Mawr.

It was an important site in the ancient commote (or cantref; sources disagree) of Mochnant, as indicated by the ym-Mochnant in its name (translates to "in Mochnant").

Until 1974, Llanrhaeadr-ym-Mochnant was split into two civil parishes: the northern parish was in historic Denbighshire and the southern parish in historic Montgomeryshire; this reflected the division of the ancient commote in the 12th century. The divide continued between 1974 and 1996, with the former Denbighshire parish being placed in Clwyd and the former Montgomeryshire parish in Powys, each with their own community councils. In 1996, both parts of Llanrhaeadr-ym-Mochnant were united within the county of Powys, and the community councils were amalgamated in 2008.

Buildings and antiquities
Capel Seion is in the village. It is a Methodist chapel rebuilt in the early 20th century in Arts and Crafts style.

Population
In the 2001 Census the population was 1,470, of whom 55% were Welsh-speaking. In the 2011 census the population had fallen to 1,195, with 408 in the village itself.

The village falls in the electoral ward of Llanrhaeadr-ym-Mochnant/Llansilin. The ward population at the 2011 Census was 2,295.

Parish church

The Norman church of St Dogfan is a Grade II* listed building, restored between 1879 and 1882, but with parts dating back to the 13th century. There is a gravestone with a Celtic cross possibly commemorating Cwgan son of Ethelstan, a Welsh prince of the 11th century.

The parish is best known for its former vicar, William Morgan (1545– 1604), who first translated the whole Bible into Welsh in the 1580s and later became a bishop of Llandaff and of St. Asaph. Gwallter Mechain (1761–1849), the bard, was the vicar from 1837 until his death in 1849. Rev. Griffith Hartwell Jones (1859–1944), a Welsh academic and Anglican clergyman was born in the village.

St Dogfan was a son of Brychan Brycheiniog and a Welsh prince in the 5th century. A clas dedicated to him was founded on the site of the present church. The holy well of the saint is on the farm of Gwernfeifod in Cwm-ffynnon.

Local attractions
Attractions near the village include the Pistyll Rhaeadr waterfall, known for its natural arch, the Berwyn Mountains, and Lake Vyrnwy.

Public transport
Bus services are operated by Tanat Valley Coaches, based in the village. Route 76 links the village with Llanfyllin, Meifod and Welshpool. Routes 79/79A connect the town with Llangynog, Llangedwyn, Penybontfawr and Oswestry.

The village was at one point served by the defunct Tanat Valley Light Railway which served Pentrefelin, Llanrhaiadr Mochnant and Pedairffordd Halt. Of these station, Llanrhaiadr Mochant was the closest one to the village being around a mile south east. These closed in 1951 to passengers along with the line to Llangynog but the line remained open to freight to as far as Llanrhaeadr Mochant until 1964 when the entire line to Blodwell Junction was closed.

The trackbed has been incorporated into agricultural use but the newly formed Tanat Valley Light Railway has expressed interest in reopening the line to as far as Llanrhaiadr Mochnant for heritage and tourist use; it is currently focused on reaching Blodwell Junction from Nantmawr.

Film location
Parts of the 1995 film The Englishman Who Went Up a Hill But Came Down a Mountain, starring Hugh Grant, were filmed in the village, portraying the real-life village of Taff's Well, in Rhondda Cynon Taf, which by 1995 had become too developed to use.

More recently, the village featured in the 2012 film Nativity 2: Danger in the Manger with David Tennant, as the village where the St. Bernadette's school bus stopped to buy sweets on the way to Lake Vyrnwy in search of the (fictitious) Castell Llawen ('Merry Castle').

References

External links
Photos of Llanrhaeadr-ym-Mochnant and surrounding area on geograph

Villages in Powys